The following is the final results of the Iran Super League 1999/2000 basketball season.

Participated teams

Dokhaniat Urmia
Fajr Sepah Tehran
Foolad Mobarakeh Isfahan
Homa Tehran
Paykan Tehran
Rah Ahan Tehran
Shahrdari Gorgan
Zob Ahan Isfahan

Final standing
Zob Ahan Isfahan
Paykan Tehran
Shahrdari Gorgan
Foolad Mobarakeh Isfahan

External links
 Asia-Basket
 iranbasketball.org

Iranian Basketball Super League seasons
League
Iran